Typhlocypris trigonella is a species of ostracod crustacean in the family Candonidae. It is endemic to Slovenia, where it is known only from Postojna Cave.

References

Candonidae
Freshwater crustaceans of Europe
Crustaceans described in 1938
Endemic fauna of Slovenia
Taxonomy articles created by Polbot
Taxobox binomials not recognized by IUCN